Martine Leguille-Balloy (born 6 September 1957) is a French politician of La République En Marche! (LREM) who was elected to the French National Assembly on 18 June 2017, representing the department of Vendée.

Political career
In 2012, Leguille-Balloy joined the Union of Democrats and Independents (UDI). An ally of Jean Arthuis within the Centrist Alliance, she supported the Alliance's decision not to endorse any candidate in The Republicans' primaries ahead of the 2017 presidential election. When the Centrist Alliance formally endorsed Emmanuel Macron instead, Leguille-Balloy and the Alliance's other members were excluded from the UDI. In the 2017 French legislative election, she defeated Véronique Besse. 

In parliament, Leguille-Balloy served as member of the Foreign Affairs Committee. In addition to her committee assignments, she is part of the French Parliamentary Friendship Group with the Philippines. Since 2019, she has also been a member of the French delegation to the Franco-German Parliamentary Assembly and a substitute member of the French delegation to the Parliamentary Assembly of the Council of Europe (PACE).

She lost her seat to Véronique Besse in the 2022 French legislative election.

Political positions
In July 2019, Leguille-Balloy voted in favor of the French ratification of the European Union’s Comprehensive Economic and Trade Agreement (CETA) with Canada.

See also
 2017 French legislative election

References

1957 births
Living people
Deputies of the 15th National Assembly of the French Fifth Republic
La République En Marche! politicians
21st-century French women politicians
Place of birth missing (living people)
Women members of the National Assembly (France)
Union of Democrats and Independents politicians
Members of Parliament for Vendée